Catherine Mann is an American author of romance fiction.

She has published numerous books with Berkley, Sourcebooks, and Harlequin Desire. In 2003 Mann won the "Best Contemporary" RITA Award for Taking Cover. She has also won a Romantic Times Reviewer's Choice Award, a Booksellers' Best Award, and celebrated six RITA Award finals.

Mann holds a master's degree in Theater from UNC-Greensboro and a bachelor's degree in Fine Arts from the College of Charleston.

Bibliography

Stand Alones   
Wedding at White Sands - June 2002
The Cinderella Mission - February 2003
Pursued - November 2004
The Executive’s Surprise Baby - December 2007
Propositioned into a Foreign Affair - May 2009
Bossman’s Baby Scandal - January 2010
Acquired: CEO’s Small Town Bride - April 2011
Billionaires Jet Set Babies - July 2011
Honorable Intentions - April 2012
Rich Man’s Fake Fiancee in In Bed With Her Boss - February 2014
Sheltered by the Millionaire - August 2014
A Christmas Baby Surprise - December 2015
Taking Home the Tycoon - June 2017

Novellas  
 Wingman’s Angel in A Soldier’s Christmas - November 2004, October 2006 (reissue)
 The Joker in Bet Me - August 2007
 Christmas at His Command in Holiday Heroes - November 2007
 Touched by Love in More Than Words 3 - October 2006 and More Than Words: Stories of Hope - March 2010
 Pregnant with the Playboy’s Baby in Winning It All - August 2010
 Home for Christmas in Rescuing Christmas - November 2012
 Dog Tags in Love Bites - June 2012, December 2012 (reissue)
 In Plain Sight in The Way of the Warrior - October 2014

Beachcombers  
 Baby, I’m Yours - April 2006
 Under the Millionaire’s Influence - March 2007
 Rich Man’s Fake Fiancée - June 2008

Wingman Warriors  
 Grayson’s Surrender - September 2002, February 2014 (reissue)
 Taking Cover - November 2002, February 2014 (reissue)
 Under Siege - January 2003
 Private Maneuvers - June 2003
 Strategic Engagement - November 2003
 Anything, Anywhere, Anytime - March 2004
 Joint Forces - May 2004
 Wingman’s Angel in A Soldier’s Christmas - November 2004, October 2006 (reissue)
 Explosive Alliance - February 2005
 The Captive’s Return - October 2005
 Awaken to Danger - January 2006
 Fully Engaged - November 2006
 Christmas at His Command in Holiday Heroes - November 2007
 Out of Uniform in Snowstorm Heat Bundle - February 2008
 Home for Christmas in Rescuing Christmas - November 2012

Landis Brothers  
 Rich Man’s Fake Fiancée - June 2008
 His Expectant Ex - September 2008
 Millionaire in Command - October 2009
 Tycoon Takes A Wife - May 2010

Special Operations  
 Code of Honor - August 2005
 Blaze of Glory - July 2006
 On Target - June 2007

Rich Rugged & Royal  
 Tycoon Takes A Wife - May 2010
 The Maverick Prince - November 2010
 His Thirty-Day Fiancee - January 2011
 His Heir, Her Honor - March 2011

Alpha Brotherhood  
 An Inconvenient Affair - August 2012
 All or Nothing - January 2013
 Playing for Keeps - April 2013
 Yuletide Baby Surprise - October 2013
 For the Sake of Their Son - October 2013

 Dark Ops  
 Defender - April 2009
 Hotshot - May 2009
 Renegade - January 2010
 Protector - March 2012
 Guardian - September 2012

 Elite Force  
 Cover Me - July 2011
 Hot Zone - December 2011
 Under Fire - May 2012
 Free Fall - March 2013
 In Plain Sight in The Way of the Warrior - October 2014

 Diamonds in the Rough  One Good Cowboy - April 2014Pursued by the Rich Rancher - June 2015Pregnant by the Cowboy CEO - July 2015

 Second Chance Ranch   Shelter Me - February 2014Rescue Me - July 2014

 Runaway Brides   
- coauthored by Catherine Mann and Joanne RockHow to Lose a Groom in 10 DaysThe Wedding AuditionThere Goes the BrideBride on the Run Bayou Billionaire  
 His Pregnant Princess Bride (book 1)
 His Secretary's Surprise Fiancé by Joanne Rock (book 2)
 Reunited with the Rebel Billionaire (book 3)
 Secret Baby Scandal by Joanne Rock (book 4)

 Lourdes of Key Largo  The Boss' Baby Arrangement - September 2016His Secretary's Little Secret - November 2016

 Alaskan Oil Barons   The Baby Claim'' - October 2017

References

External links
 

21st-century American novelists
American women novelists
21st-century American women writers
Living people
Year of birth missing (living people)